is a 1960 Japanese drama directed by Mikio Naruse.

Plot
Keiko (called "Mama" by the other characters), a young widow approaching 30, is a hostess at a bar in Ginza. Realizing she is getting older, she decides after talking to her bar manager, Komatsu, that she wants to open her own bar rather than remarrying and dishonoring her late husband to whose memory she is still devoted. To accomplish this, she must secure loans from some affluent patrons who frequent her bar, but has little success.

Meanwhile, Yuri, a former employee, has opened up her own bar nearby, consequently taking away most of Keiko's former customers. She scouts locations for her own bar with a confidant of her bar, Junko, undecided as to where she will open up. While Keiko has lunch with Yuri, whom she believes is doing well in her enterprise, Yuri reveals that she is deep in debt and cannot afford to pay off her creditors. She tells Keiko she plans to fake a suicide to keep her creditors at bay. Keiko is shocked to learn the next day that Yuri has actually died, and that she had either planned her death all along or had misjudged the amount of sleeping pills to take. She is shocked to see Yuri's creditors dunning her family for money while still in mourning.

After Keiko is diagnosed with a peptic ulcer, she retreats to her family's home to recover. It is revealed that she must give them money to keep her brother out of jail while also paying for an operation that her nephew, who was crippled by polio, needs in order to walk again. Keiko tells them she can not afford to give them money as she must keep up appearances with an expensive apartment and kimono but reluctantly agrees, realizing this will forestall any plan to open her own bar.

After Keiko returns to her bar to work, a man she briefly entertains proposes to her. When he turns out to be a fraud, she sets her sights on Fujisaki, a businessman interested in her. While promising to give her money after sleeping with her, he tells her he has been transferred to Osaka for work and cannot abandon his family. Keiko is given a stern lecture by Komatsu, who loves Keiko but has made no previous attempt to express this due to his respect for her reverence for her dead husband and her resolve to not to sleep with other men. He asks Keiko to marry him and open a new bar together. However, she declines, saying that a marriage like this could not work since "they know each other too well", and, though she can't bring herself to say it, loves the married Fujisaki. Still in love with Keiko, Komatsu quits the bar after she refuses his marriage proposal. Keiko returns again to work, ascending the stairs, pretending to be happy.

Cast
 Hideko Takamine as Keiko Yashiro
 Masayuki Mori as Nobuhiko Fujisaki
 Reiko Dan as Junko Inchihashi
 Tatsuya Nakadai as Kenichi Komatsu, Keiko's manager
 Daisuke Katō as Matsukichi Sekine
 Nakamura Ganjirō II as Goda
 Eitaro Ozawa as Minobe
 Keiko Awaji as Yuri
 Kyū Sazanka as Bar owner
 Noriko Sengoku as Fortune-teller
 Chieko Nakakita as Tomoko

Home media
In 2007, The Criterion Collection released a one-disc Region 1 DVD edition.  Special features included an audio commentary by Donald Richie, a new interview with Tatsuya Nakadai, the theatrical trailer and new English subtitle translation.  The edition also included a booklet containing essays by Phillip Lopate, Catherine Russell, Audie Bock, and Hideko Takamine.

References

External links
 
 
 When a Woman Ascends the Stairs at the Japanese Movie Database 
 
When a Woman Ascends the Stairs: They Endure an essay by Phillip Lopate at the Criterion Collection

1960 films
1960 drama films
Japanese black-and-white films
Films directed by Mikio Naruse
Japanese drama films
1960s Japanese-language films
Films shot in Tokyo
Films with screenplays by Ryuzo Kikushima
Films produced by Ryuzo Kikushima
1960s Japanese films